Indra Overland  (spelled Øverland in Norwegian) is a specialist on energy politics. He did his PhD at the University of Cambridge, UK, and has later published on a broad range of energy politics issues. The PhD thesis was awarded the Toby Jackman Prize.

He is Research Professor and Head of the Centre for Energy Research at the Norwegian Institute of International Affairs. Some of his main works include The Misallocation of Climate Research Funding, The ASEAN Climate and Energy Paradox, Russian Oil Companies in an Evolving World: The Challenge of Change, The Geopolitics of Renewable Energy: Debunking Four Emerging Myths, The GeGaLo Index: Geopolitical Gains and Losses after Energy Transition, Public Brainpower: Civil Society and Natural Resource Management, and Energy: The missing link in globalization.

He is best known for his contribution of the concept 'slippery slopes' to the theorisation of the resource curse. 'Slippery slopes' refers to the difficult decision that authoritarian and semi-authoritarian rulers make between crackling down on opposition or allowing it to simmer, and the potential role of natural resource rents in making this decision.

Overland appears regularly as a commentator in the media and has been cited in Financial Times, Wall Street Journal, Newsweek, Associated Press, Bloomberg, BBC World Service, The Guardian, The Telegraph, Times Literary Supplement, Hokkaido Shimbun, Toronto Star, Het Financieele Dagblad, Radio Free Europe and Politiken.

See also
Afghans in Tajikistan

References

External links
Indra Overland on the web page of the Norwegian Institute of International Affairs

Norwegian academics
Alumni of the University of Cambridge
Writers about the Soviet Union
Writers about Russia
1973 births
Living people
People of the Scott Polar Research Institute